The 1951 Cupa României is the 14th edition of Romania's most prestigious football cup competition.

The title was won by CCA București against Flacăra Mediaş.

Format
The competition is an annual knockout tournament.

In the first round proper, two pots were made, first pot with Divizia A teams and other teams till 16 and the second pot with the rest of teams qualified in this phase. First pot teams will play away. Each tie is played as a single leg.

If a match is drawn after 90 minutes, the game goes in extra time, and if the scored is still tight after 120 minutes, the team who plays away will qualify.

In case the teams are from same city, there a replay will be played.

In case the teams play in the final, there a replay will be played.

From the first edition, the teams from Divizia A entered in competition in sixteen finals, rule which remained till today.

First round proper

|colspan=3 style="background-color:#FFCCCC;"|27 June 1951

|}

Second round proper

|colspan=3 style="background-color:#FFCCCC;"|1 July 1951

|-
|colspan=3 style="background-color:#FFCCCC;"|4 July 1951

|}

Quarter-finals 

|colspan=3 style="background-color:#FFCCCC;"|5 September 1951

|-
|colspan=3 style="background-color:#FFCCCC;"|12 September 1951

|}

Semi-finals

|colspan=3 style="background-color:#FFCCCC;"|24 October 1951

|-
|colspan=3 style="background-color:#FFCCCC;"|1 November 1951

|}

Final

References

External links
 romaniansoccer.ro
 Official site

Cupa României seasons
Cupa Romaniei
Romania